Ayangudi is an Indian village located in Kattumannarkoil taluk in the Cuddalore, Tamil Nadu, India.

Average Sex Ratio of Ayangudi village is 1087 which is higher than Tamil Nadu state average of 2500. Child Sex Ratio for the Ayangudi as per census is 4000, higher than Tamil Nadu average of 4500.

Ayangudi village has higher literacy rate compared to Tamil Nadu. In 2018, literacy rate of Ayangudi village was 83.99% compared to 80.09% of Tamil Nadu. In Ayangudi Male literacy stands at 89.23% while female literacy rate was 79.23%.

As per constitution of India and Panchyati Raaj Act, Ayangudi village is administrated by Sarpanch (Head of Village) who is elected representative of village.

Education institutions
 Muslim High School - Ayangudi
 Al-Ameen Nursery & Primary School - Ayangudi
Government Elementary School - Ayangudi & Melappakathurai

Bank
 Indian Bank
Indian bank ATM
One india ATM

Health
 Ayangudi Government Primary Health Centre Pharmacy
West way society medical center
AR Medical
Clinic
Dr.Mujammel

References

Villages in Cuddalore district